The 2017–18 European Rugby Champions Cup-Challenge Cup play-off was the third play-off for entry into the top-level competition of European Club rugby union, the European Rugby Champions Cup.

Format
Following a break to ease fixture congestion caused by the 2015 Rugby World Cup, the three-team play-off held in 2015–16 was expanded, and a four-team format was announced.

The play-off comprised 3 matches, contested by one team from the Premiership, one from the Top 14, and two from the Pro14.

The two Pro12 teams each played one of the Premiership or Top 14 sides in a single-leg semi-final, held at the home ground of the non-Pro12 side. The winners of these matches then contested a play-off final, with the winner of this match competing in the 2017–18 European Rugby Champions Cup. The three losing teams all competed in the 2017–18 European Rugby Challenge Cup.

Teams

Four teams competed in the play-off, having qualified as either the highest team from each league that did not already qualify for the Champions Cup, or as the winner of the 2016–17 European Rugby Challenge Cup.

The following teams had qualified for the play-off:

Matches
A draw was held on 15 March 2017 to determine the two semi-final matches.

Semi-finals

 Cardiff Blues were demoted to the 2017–18 European Rugby Challenge Cup

 Connacht drop to the 2017–18 European Rugby Challenge Cup

Play-off final
The draw for the semi-finals was also used to decide that the winner of the second semi-final would have home advantage in the play-off final.

 Northampton Saints qualified for the 2017–18 European Rugby Champions Cup. Stade Français played in the 2017–18 European Rugby Challenge Cup.

See also
 2017–18 European Rugby Champions Cup
 2017–18 European Rugby Challenge Cup

References

2017-18
2017–18 European Rugby Champions Cup
2017–18 European Rugby Challenge Cup
Northampton Saints matches
Connacht Rugby matches
Stade Français matches
Cardiff Rugby matches
2016–17 in Irish rugby union
2016–17 in Welsh rugby union
2016–17 in French rugby union
2016–17 in English rugby union